2015 Malta Open is a darts tournament, which took place in Buġibba, Malta in 2015.

Results

Last 32

Last 16

References

2015 in darts
2015 in Maltese sport
St. Paul's Bay
Darts in Malta